Jean Marie Carrabba (born 20 November 1982), known as Jean Marie is an Italian DJ, producer, songwriter and remixer.

Career 
JEAN MARIE was producing & DJing under the name Hotfunkboys before. In 2016 he released the single 'Basketball' under the name Jean Marie, with vocals by the American rapper Flo Rida and the Spanish pop singer Marta Sánchez.  He is signed to Spinnin' Records, Sony Music, Smash The House and more record labels. In 2017, he presented his song 'Moonlight Fiesta' at the Ultra Music Festival Miami Main stage featuring Sean Paul. He has DJed at festivals Spring Break in Croatia and the Sun Valley Festival in Switzerland. He entered the Top 10 Main Chart of Beatport and iTunes several times and has released digital and radio interviews, including DJ Mag, In 2018, He released 'Gaia' featuring Vini Vici and Blastoyz on Spinnin' Records and crossed over more than 1 Million Streams, later in 2019, Vini Vici, Jean Marie and Hilight Tribe together released a new single 'Moyoni' via Smash The House.

In 2020, He projected 'Future Kids' with multiple DJs and producers, also featuring Snopp Dogg on the project.

In 2021, He released 'Kiss Me Now' featuring Flo Rida and Future Kids

Discography

References 

1982 births
Living people
Italian DJs
Italian record producers
Italian songwriters
Male songwriters
Remixers